The 1986–87 Washington State Cougars men's basketball team represented Washington State University for the 1986–87 NCAA Division I men's basketball season. Led by fourth-year head coach Len Stevens, the Cougars were members of the Pacific-10 Conference and played their home games on campus at Beasley Coliseum in Pullman, Washington.

The conference tournament debuted this year; seeded ninth, WSU lost to eighth-seed Arizona State by sixteen points in the opening round.

A month after the season ended, Stevens resigned in early April to become head coach at Nevada, then a member of the Big Sky Conference; assistant Kelvin Sampson was soon promoted to head coach, and led the program for seven seasons.

Postseason result

|-
!colspan=5 style=| Pacific-10 Tournament

References

External links
Sports Reference – Washington State Cougars: 1986–87 basketball season

Washington State Cougars men's basketball seasons
Washington State Cougars
Washington State
Washington State